Soakai Motuʻapuaka (born Te'ekiu, circa 1953) is a Tongan former rugby union prop and Deputy Commissioner of Community Policing of his country. He contributed to Tongan rugby union while in duty.

Career
Motuʻapuaka was one of the key players in the Tonga Police Force first team in which at one stage he became captain. 
He debuted for Tonga against Fiji, in Suva, on 8 September 1979. He was also part of the 1987 Rugby World Cup Ikale Tahi squad trained by the Prince Mailefihi, playing only the pool stage match against Canada, in Napier, which was his last cap for Tonga.

Personal life
Motuʻapuaka joined the Tonga Police Force on 14 August 1978 after serving in the United States Army with a diploma. He started as corporal before being promoted as sergeant in 1984. He then was promoted as Inspector of Police, Assistant Chief Inspector of Police, Chief Inspector, Assistant Superintendent and Assistant Police Commander, before being finally promoted as Deputy Commissioner of Community Policing on 2013. In 1994, he attended the New Zealand Police College in Porirua before his graduation as police cadet. At the age of 60, Motuʻapuaka retired from police duty on 25 November 2013.

References

External links
Soakai Motu'apuaka international stats

1963 births
Living people
Tongan rugby union players
Rugby union props
Tonga international rugby union players